The Iowa General Assembly is the legislative branch of the state government of Iowa. Like the federal United States Congress, the General Assembly is a bicameral body, composed of the  upper house Iowa Senate and the lower Iowa House of Representatives respectively. The Senate consists of four year terms and the House consists of two year terms. The General Assembly convenes within the Iowa State Capitol in Des Moines.

Composition
The Iowa General Assembly consists of 50 senators and 100 representatives. Each senator represents about 60,927 people and each representative about 30,464 people .  The last redistricting was enacted on April 19, 2011 for the 2012 elections 85th General Assembly. The assembly convenes annually on the second Monday in January.

Leaders in the Senate are President Jake Chapman (R), and President Pro Tempore Brad Zaun (R).  Partisan Senate leadership includes Majority Leader Jack Whitver (R), and Minority Leader Zach Wahls (D). In the House, the Speaker is Pat Grassley (R), and the Speaker Pro Tempore John Wills (R).  Partisan House leadership includes Majority Leader Matt Windschitl (R), and Minority Leader Todd Prichard (D).

Composition of the 90th General Assembly of Iowa (2023–2024)

See also
Iowa Senate
Iowa House of Representatives
Governor of Iowa

References

External links

 Iowa Legislature official government website
 Iowa General Assembly official website
 Iowa Code
 Iowa Constitution

1846 establishments in Iowa